The Croatian Footballer of the Year is the most prestigious annual association football award in Croatia. It is awarded by the newspaper Večernji list to the best Croatian football player in the preceding year, regardless of the league they play in, based on a points system which measures their performances for both club and country. The award is usually presented in a ceremony hosted by the Croatian Football Federation.

The award was established in 1972 and, until 1990, the award was given to the best Yugoslav player in the preceding year. Since the breakup of Yugoslavia in 1991, the award is given to the best Croatian player. Luka Modrić holds the record for most wins, with eleven awards. Davor Šuker is second with six awards. They are followed by Dado Pršo with three wins from 2003 to 2005.

In 1995, a separate award, the Hope of the Year (Croatian: Nada godine), was introduced. It is awarded to the best young Croatian player. As of 2020, only Ivica Olić and Luka Modrić have won both the Hope of the Year and Footballer of the Year awards.

List of winners

Yugoslav Footballer of the Year (1972–90)
† denotes shared wins

Croatian Footballer of the Year (1991–present)

 

Notes on club name changes:
Dinamo Zagreb changed their name to "HAŠK Građanski" in June 1991 and then again in February 1993 to "Croatia Zagreb". They reverted to "Dinamo Zagreb" in February 2000.
The NK Varteks changed their 52-year-old name to "NK Varaždin" in June 2010, then folded in 2015. Two newer clubs, both unassociated with the defunct team, use the defunct club's names: NK Varteks (founded 2011) and NK Varaždin (founded 2012 as "Varaždin ŠN", picked up the "NK Varaždin" name when the older club folded).

Multiple winners
Players in bold are still active. Wins in italics denote wins in Yugoslav competition before 1991.

See also
Sportske novosti Yellow Shirt award, for the HNL footballer of the year, given by the Croatian sport newspaper Sportske novosti, chosen by sport journalists.
Football Oscar, given by the Croatian union Football syndicate, chosen by players and managers of league clubs.
Prva HNL Best Player of the Year, given by the Croatian web site Tportal, chosen by captains of league clubs.

References

External links
Complete list of winners 1972–2010

Croatian football trophies and awards
Awards established in 1972
Association football in Croatia lists
 
Football
1972 establishments in Croatia
Annual events in Croatia
Association football player non-biographical articles